Ernst Fritz Fürbringer (27 July 1900 – 30 October 1988) was a German film actor. He appeared in 130 films between 1933 and 1983. He was born in Brunswick, Germany and died in Munich, Germany.

Selected filmography

 Die große und die kleine Welt (1936)
 Street Music (1936) - Geschäftsführer im Café 'Dorado'
 Dinner Is Served (1936) - Charles
 Du bist mein Glück (1936)
 Truxa (1937) - Garvin
 Ein Volksfeind (1937) - Ministerialrat
 The Stars Shine (1938) - Hans Holger 
 Dreizehn Mann und eine Kanone (1938)
 Water for Canitoga (1939) - Sheriff von Canitoga
 Fasching (1939) - Direktor Peter Wendland
 Der singende Tor (1939) - Defense lawyer
  (1939) - Lorenzo Perelli
 The Fire Devil (1940) - Prince von Metternich
 The Girl from Barnhelm (1940) - Von Schornow
 Carl Peters (1941) - Count Wehr-Bandelin
 Venus on Trial (1941) - Paul Dreysing, Zeichner
 Kameraden (1941) -Count Saint Marsan
 Alarmstufe V (1941) - Director Gentzmer
 Vienna Blood (1942) - Metternich
 Die heimlichen Bräute (1942)
 Andreas Schlüter (1942) - Baron Eosander
 The Endless Road (1943) - General Andrew Jackson
 Die unheimliche Wandlung des Axel Roscher (1943) - Eveillard
 Titanic (1943) - Sir Bruce Ismay
 I Need You (1944) - Dr. Max Hoffmann
 Ein Blick zurück (1944) - Professor Ammerfors
 Ich bitte um Vollmacht (1944) - Lawyer Dr. Norbert Hartwig
 Der Fall Molander (1945) 
 Geld ins Haus (1947) - Rienösl, Advokat
 Ghost in the Castle (1947) - Alexander Graf
  (1948) - Doctor
 The Trip to Marrakesh (1949) - Jean
 Der große Fall (1949) - Ein undurchsichtiger Herr
 Crown Jewels (1950)
 Border Post 58 (1951) - Grenzpolizeiinspektor Hirzinger
 The Lady in Black (1951) - Banker Petterson
 The Blue Star of the South (1951) - Niccolini
 Captive Soul (1952)
 Two People (1952) - Monsignore
 The Blue and White Lion (1952) - Vorsitzender des Gerichts
 Captain Bay-Bay (1953) - Präfekt
 The Chaplain of San Lorenzo (1953) - Prosecutor
 A Heart Plays False (1953)
 Jackboot Mutiny (1955) - Erwin von Witzleben
  (1956) - Hubert Scharfenberg 
 King in Shadow (1957) - (uncredited)
 The Girl and the Legend (1957) - Lord Horace
 The Devil Strikes at Night (1957) - Justice Dr. Schleffien
 The Crammer (1958) - School inspector Wagner 
 Resurrection (1958) - Oberst 
 Der Frosch mit der Maske (1959) - Sir Archibald
 The Man Who Walked Through the Wall (1959) - Arzt
 Mrs. Warren's Profession (1960) - Praed
 The Crimson Circle (1960) - Sir Archibald Morton
 The Terrible People (1960) - Sir Archibald
 You Must Be Blonde on Capri (1961) - von Straaten
 The Puzzle of the Red Orchid (1962) - Sir John (uncredited)
  (1963, TV miniseries) - Donald Edwards
  (1963, TV film) - Juror 4
  (1963) - Hartmann
 A Mission for Mr. Dodd (1964) - Sir Gerald Blythe
 Dead Woman from Beverly Hills (1964) - Professor Sostlov
 The Curse of the Hidden Vault (1964) - Connor
  (1964) - School Director
 Tante Frieda – Neue Lausbubengeschichten (1965) - School Director (uncredited)
 Kommissar X – In den Klauen des goldenen Drachen (1966) - Professor Akron 
 Is Paris Burning? (1966) - General von Boineburg
  (1967, TV miniseries) - Police Inspector Brown
 Der Monat der fallenden Blätter (1968, TV film) - Prof. Harold Hilliard
 Hannibal Brooks (1969) - Elephant Keeper Kellerman 
  (1969) - The Elephant (voice)
  (1969) - Schuldirektor
 Father Brown (1970-1972, TV series) - Inspector Gilbert Burns
 Tiger Gang (1971) - Prof. Tavaria / Frank Stefani
  (1972) - Professor Schott
 Night Flight from Moscow (1973) - Pastor (uncredited)
  (1976, TV film) - Dr. Schlünz
  (1978, TV miniseries) - Field Marshall Tilly
 Vom Webstuhl zur Weltmacht (1983, TV series) - Emperor Frederick III
 Derrick (1983, Episode 4: "Der Täter schickte Blumen") - Herr Baruda
  (1984, TV miniseries) - Prince Ferdinand
 Der Sonne entgegen (1985, TV series) - Professor Lembach
 Derrick (1985, Episode 6: "Das tödliche Schweigen") - Stargard
 The Black Forest Clinic (1986-1987, TV Series) - Konstantin Taubricht

References

External links

1900 births
1988 deaths
German male film actors
German male television actors
Actors from Braunschweig
20th-century Freikorps personnel
20th-century German male actors